The 2003 Arizona State Sun Devils football team represented Arizona State University during the 2003 NCAA Division I-A football season.

Schedule

References

Arizona State
Arizona State Sun Devils football seasons
Arizona State Sun Devils football